Mount Huxley is a mountain  high, situated between the lower Condit Glacier and Descent Glacier, marginal to Ferrar Glacier, at the northern end of the Royal Society Range, Victoria Land, Antarctica. It was named in 1992 by the Advisory Committee on Antarctic Names after Leonard Huxley, editor of Scott's Last Expedition, two volumes, London, 1913; Volume I being the journals of Captain R.F. Scott, RN; Volume II being the reports of journeys and scientific work undertaken by E.A. Wilson and the surviving members of the expedition. The work has long been acclaimed among narrative reports to come out of the heroic era.

References

Royal Society Range
Mountains of Victoria Land
Scott Coast